Qubevirus is a genus of positive-strand RNA viruses, in the family Fiersviridae. Enterobacteria serve as natural hosts. There are two species in this genus. In 2020, the genus was renamed from Allolevivirus to its current name.

Structure
Viruses in Qubevirus are non-enveloped, with icosahedral and spherical geometries, and T=3 symmetry. The diameter is around 26 nm.

Genome
Qubeviruses have a positive-sense, single-stranded RNA genome. The genome is linear and non-segmented and around 4kb in length. The genome codes for four proteins, which are the coat, replicase, maturation, and lysis protein.

Life cycle
Entry into the host cell is achieved by adsorption into the host cell. Replication follows the positive-strand RNA virus replication model. Positive-strand RNA virus transcription is the method of transcription. Translation takes place by suppression of termination. The virus exits the host cell by bacteria lysis. Enterobacteria serve as the natural host.

Taxonomy
The genus Qubevirus has the following two species:

 Qubevirus durum, commonly called bacteriophage Qbeta
 Qubevirus faecium

References

External links
 Viralzone: Allolevivirus
 ICTV

Virus genera
Fiersviridae